Prospect Hill Cemetery in York, Pennsylvania is a historic cemetery that was documented by the Historic American Landscapes Survey.

Founded in 1849, is the final resting place for soldiers from every American war. Two Medal of Honor recipients from the Civil War are buried on the premises.

Notable burials

 Founding Father
 Philip Livingston (1716–1778) – signer of the Declaration of Independence

 Military figures
 J. Henry Denig (1838–1876) – Civil War Medal of Honor recipient
 William B. Franklin (1823–1903) – Union Army General
 Charles H. Ilgenfritz (1837–1920 Civil War Medal of Honor recipient

 Politicians
 Jeremiah S. Black (1810–1883) – Presidential Cabinet Secretary
 Edward S. Brooks (1867–1957) – US Congressman
 Samuel Feiser Glatfelter (1858–1927) – US Congressman
 Adam John Glossbrenner (1810–1889) – US Congressman
 Adam King (1783–1835) – US Congressman
 William Henry Kurtz (1804–1868) – US Congressman
 Daniel F. Lafean (1861–1922) – US Congressman
 Henry Nes (1799–1850) – Medical doctor and US Congressman
 Jacob Spangler (1767–1843) – US Congressman
 James Alonzo Stahle (1830–1912) – US Congressman
 S. Walter Stauffer (1888–1975) – US Congressman
 Edward Danner Ziegler  (1844–1931) – US Congressman
Others
 Arthur Briggs Farquhar (1838–1925) – Businessman
 George Holtzapple (1862–1946) – Medical pioneer

References

External links
 
 
 Seven photos at Historic American Landscapes Survey
 
 

Cemeteries in Pennsylvania
1843 establishments in Pennsylvania
501(c)(3) organizations